Fall Spectacular was the name of a major professional wrestling event produced by Frontier Martial-Arts Wrestling (FMW) usually held in the month of September. It was considered to be one of the four major shows of FMW, alongside FMW Anniversary Show, Summer Spectacular and Year End Spectacular. The event was first used as a subtitle for the FMW 2nd Anniversary Show in 1991 and the FMW 3rd Anniversary Show in 1992 as both events took place in the month of September. This title would be re-used with the subtitle "Kawasaki Legend" in 1997 before FMW discontinued the use of these events as it began producing pay-per-view events in 1998.

Dates, venues and main events

References

Frontier Martial-Arts Wrestling shows
Recurring events established in 1991
Recurring events disestablished in 1997
Entertainment events in Japan